Třebíč District is a district in the Vysočina Region of the Czech Republic. Its capital is the town of Třebíč.

Administrative division
Třebíč District is divided into three administrative districts of municipalities with extended competence: Třebíč, Moravské Budějovice and Náměšť nad Oslavou.

List of municipalities
Towns are marked in bold and market towns in italics:

Babice – 
Bačice – 
Bačkovice – 
Benetice – 
Biskupice-Pulkov – 
Blatnice – 
Bochovice – 
Bohušice – 
Bransouze – 
Březník – 
Budišov – 
Budkov – 
Čáslavice – 
Častohostice – 
Čechočovice – 
Čechtín – 
Červená Lhota – 
Chlístov – 
Chlum – 
Chotěbudice – 
Číchov – 
Cidlina – 
Číhalín – 
Čikov – 
Číměř – 
Dalešice – 
Dědice – 
Dešov – 
Dolní Lažany – 
Dolní Vilémovice – 
Domamil – 
Dukovany – 
Hartvíkovice – 
Heraltice – 
Hluboké – 
Hodov – 
Horní Heřmanice – 
Horní Smrčné – 
Horní Újezd – 
Horní Vilémovice – 
Hornice – 
Hrotovice – 
Hroznatín – 
Hvězdoňovice – 
Jakubov u Moravských Budějovic – 
Jaroměřice nad Rokytnou – 
Jasenice – 
Jemnice – 
Jinošov – 
Jiratice – 
Kamenná – 
Kdousov – 
Kladeruby nad Oslavou – 
Klučov – 
Kojatice – 
Kojatín – 
Kojetice – 
Komárovice – 
Koněšín – 
Kostníky – 
Kouty – 
Kozlany – 
Kožichovice – 
Krahulov – 
Kralice nad Oslavou – 
Kramolín – 
Krhov – 
Krokočín – 
Kuroslepy – 
Láz – 
Lesná – 
Lesní Jakubov – 
Lesonice – 
Lesůňky – 
Lhánice – 
Lhotice – 
Lipník – 
Litohoř – 
Litovany – 
Lomy – 
Loukovice – 
Lovčovice – 
Lukov – 
Markvartice – 
Martínkov – 
Mastník – 
Menhartice – 
Meziříčko – 
Mikulovice – 
Mladoňovice – 
Mohelno – 
Moravské Budějovice – 
Myslibořice – 
Naloučany – 
Náměšť nad Oslavou – 
Nárameč – 
Nimpšov – 
Nová Ves – 
Nové Syrovice – 
Nový Telečkov – 
Ocmanice – 
Odunec – 
Okarec – 
Okřešice – 
Okříšky – 
Opatov – 
Oponešice – 
Ostašov – 
Pálovice – 
Petrovice – 
Petrůvky – 
Pokojovice – 
Police – 
Popůvky – 
Pozďatín – 
Přeckov – 
Předín – 
Přešovice – 
Přibyslavice – 
Příštpo – 
Pucov – 
Pyšel – 
Račice – 
Rácovice – 
Radkovice u Budče – 
Radkovice u Hrotovic – 
Radonín – 
Radošov – 
Radotice – 
Rapotice – 
Římov – 
Rohy – 
Rokytnice nad Rokytnou – 
Rouchovany – 
Rudíkov – 
Šebkovice – 
Sedlec – 
Slavětice – 
Slavičky – 
Slavíkovice – 
Smrk – 
Stařeč – 
Štěměchy – 
Štěpkov – 
Stropešín – 
Střítež – 
Studenec – 
Studnice – 
Sudice – 
Svatoslav – 
Třebelovice – 
Třebenice – 
Třebíč – 
Třesov – 
Trnava –
Valdíkov – 
Valeč – 
Vícenice – 
Vícenice u Náměště nad Oslavou – 
Vladislav – 
Vlčatín – 
Výčapy – 
Zahrádka – 
Zárubice – 
Zašovice – 
Želetava – 
Zvěrkovice

Geography

The landscape is rugged and hilly with valleys of several rivers, and is relatively sparsely forested. The territory extends into two geomorphological mesoregions: Jevišovice Uplands (most of the territory) and Křižanov Highlands (north and west).

The most important river is the Jihlava, which flows across the district from northwest to east. Other notable rivers are the Oslava and Rokytná. The largest body of water is the Dalešice Reservoir. There are also many ponds, especially in the northern part of the territory.

There are no protected landscape areas, only small-scale protected areas.

Demographics

Most populated municipalities

Economy
The largest employers with its headquarters in Třebíč District and at least 500 employers are:

A facility of national importance is the Dukovany Nuclear Power Station, one of two nuclear power stations in the country.

Transport
There are no motorways passing through the district. The most important road is the I/38 from Jihlava to Znojmo, part of European route E59.

Sights

Jewish Quarter and St Procopius' Basilica in Třebíč was designated a UNESCO World Heritage Site in 2003 as an example of coexistence and interchange between Jewish and Christian cultures.

The most important monuments in the district, protected as national cultural monuments, are:
Jaroměřice nad Rokytnou Castle with the Church of Saint Margaret
Náměšť nad Oslavou Castle
Church of the Assumption of the Virgin Mary in Polná
Benedictine monastery with the St. Procopius Basilica in Třebíč
Jewish Cemetery in Třebíč

The best-preserved settlements and landscapes, protected as monument reservations and monument zones, are:
Dešov (monument reservation)
Jaroměřice nad Rokytnou
Jemnice
Moravské Budějovice
Náměšť nad Oslavou
Třebíč
Boňov
Landscape around Náměšť nad Oslavou

The most visited tourist destinations are the St. Procopius Basilica in Třebíč and Jaroměřice nad Rokytnou Castle.

References

External links

Třebíč District profile on the Czech Statistical Office's website

 
Districts of the Czech Republic